The 2017 Ireland Tri-Nation Series was a One Day International cricket tournament that took place in Ireland in May 2017. It was a tri-nation series between Ireland, Bangladesh and New Zealand. The matches were in preparation for the 2017 ICC Champions Trophy, which took place in June 2017 in England and Wales. Cricket Ireland announced the full fixtures in July 2016. Ahead of the ODI fixtures, Ireland played two warm-up matches; a 50-over match against Bangladesh and a 25-over match against New Zealand.

Prior to the tournament, Bangladesh's captain Mashrafe Mortaza was suspended for one match for maintaining a slow over-rate in the third ODI between Sri Lanka and Bangladesh in April 2017. Shakib Al Hasan captained Bangladesh for the first match.

New Zealand won the tournament, after they beat Ireland by 190 runs in the fifth ODI of the competition.

Squads

New Zealand Cricket announced their ODI squad in early April 2017, with ten international players being unavailable because of their commitments to the 2017 Indian Premier League. Jeetan Patel joined New Zealand's squad for their fourth ODI and players involved in the IPL joined the squad on a case-by-case basis. Adam Milne, Corey Anderson and Matt Henry were added to New Zealand's squad ahead of the match against Ireland on 21 May 2017.

Points table

Practice matches

50-overs: Ireland A v Bangladeshis

25-overs: Ireland A v New Zealanders

ODI matches

1st ODI

2nd ODI

3rd ODI

4th ODI

5th ODI

6th ODI

References

External links
 Series home at ESPN Cricinfo

Ireland Tri-Nation Series
Ireland Tri-Nation Series
Ireland Tri-Nation Series
Ireland Tri-Nation Series
Bangladeshi cricket tours of Ireland
New Zealand cricket tours of Ireland